Federico Galera (born 17 February 1953) is a Spanish modern pentathlete. He competed at the 1980 and 1984 Summer Olympics.

References

External links
 

1953 births
Living people
Spanish male modern pentathletes
Olympic modern pentathletes of Spain
Modern pentathletes at the 1980 Summer Olympics
Modern pentathletes at the 1984 Summer Olympics